C33 or C-33 may refer to:

Vehicles 
Aircraft
 Beechcraft C33 Debonair, an American civil utility aircraft
 Boeing C-33, a proposed American military transport
 Caspar C 33, a German trainer
 Caudron C.33, a French passenger biplane
 Douglas C-33, an American military transport

Automobiles
 Nissan Laurel C33, a Japanese sedan
 Sauber C33, a Swiss Formula One car

Ships
 , a C-class submarine of the Royal Navy

Other uses 
 Autopista C-33, a highway in Catalonia, Spain
 C33 road (Namibia)
 Caldwell 33, a supernova remnant
 Head and neck cancer
 King's Gambit Accepted, a chess opening
 C.3.3., the pseudonym used by Oscar Wilde to publish his poem "The Ballad of Reading Gaol"